Donald Richard Lowth (20 October 1931 – 18 June 2009) was an Australian international rugby union player. He also played first-grade rugby league for North Sydney.

Biography
Born in the Whitsundays town of Collinsville, Lowth played club rugby for Brisbane-based club GPS. In 1953, Lowth and a GPS teammate appeared under assumed names for the American All-Stars, a touring rugby league team for the United States. When Queensland rugby officials found out he was banned and subsequently moved to Melbourne.

While in Melbourne, Lowth continued to play rugby union and became a Victorian state representative. During this time he also trialled with Australian rules football club Richmond.

By 1957 he had moved to Sydney, where he played rugby union for Manly. He attempted to compete in trials that year for the national team but was deemed to be ineligible after being recognised by Australian Rugby Union chairman Tom McCormack while playing in Sydney. The ban was eventually revoked and in 1958 he toured New Zealand and featured in the first Bledisloe Cup test match in Wellington, as a replacement flanker for John Thornett.

In the 1960 NSWRFL season he made four first-grade rugby league appearances for North Sydney, playing as a second-row forward.

References

External links
Don Lowth at Rugby League project

1931 births
2009 deaths
Australian rugby league players
North Sydney Bears players
Rugby league players from Queensland
Rugby league second-rows
Australian rugby union players
Australia international rugby union players
Rugby union flankers
Rugby union players from Queensland